"Sowin' Love" is a song co-written and recorded by American country music artist Paul Overstreet.  It was released in March 1989 as the second single and title track from his album Sowin' Love.  The song reached #9 on the Billboard Hot Country Singles & Tracks chart in June 1989.  It was written by Overstreet and Don Schlitz.

Chart performance

References

1989 singles
Paul Overstreet songs
Songs written by Paul Overstreet
Songs written by Don Schlitz
Song recordings produced by James Stroud
RCA Records singles
1989 songs